Burton Levin (September 28, 1930 – October 31, 2016) was the SIT Investment Visiting Professor of Asian Policy at Carleton College.

Life
He was born in New York City. He earned his BA in 1952 from Brooklyn College, and his MA in International Affairs at Columbia University and went on to work in the Foreign Service.  Levin served as Director of Mission in Thailand, Consul General in Hong Kong and was the United States Ambassador to Burma from 1987 to 1990.

Levin was a visiting fellow at the Hoover Institute at Stanford University, and a visiting scholar at Harvard University. After retiring from the Foreign Service, he became the head of the Hong Kong office of The Asia Society.

He also sat on the board of directors for the Mansfield Foundation, the China Fund and the Noble Group.

He died in Massachusetts on October 31, 2016.

References

External links
 PBS interview with Levin
 

School of International and Public Affairs, Columbia University alumni
Harvard University staff
Hoover Institution people
Ambassadors of the United States to Myanmar
2016 deaths
Carleton College faculty
1930 births
United States Foreign Service personnel
Brooklyn College alumni
Consuls general of the United States in Hong Kong and Macau